Westfield CENTRO (formally known as CentrO until August 31st, 2021) is a shopping mall in Oberhausen, North Rhine-Westphalia, Germany. It forms part of a large commercial development called the Neue Mitte ("new center").

Westfield CENTRO is Germany's largest shopping mall. The development was rather controversial, with neighbouring municipalities opposing the size and scope of the project, fearing a loss of sales to businesses in their city centers.

References

External links

 Westfield CENTRO Official site

Shopping malls in Germany
Shopping malls established in 1996
Buildings and structures in Oberhausen
Tourist attractions in North Rhine-Westphalia
Tourist attractions in Oberhausen
Centro